MMMS may refer to:

 Mabelvale Magnet Middle School, a magnet middle school in Little Rock, Arkansas
 Marlboro Memorial Middle School, a middle school in Marlboro Township, New Jersey
 Meads Mill Middle School, a middle school in Northville, Michigan. 
 Merry Marvel Marching Society, a Marvel Comics fan club of the 1960s and 70s